Trenches 2 is the sequel to Trenches. It was developed by American studio Thunder Game Works.

Gameplay 
Trenches 2, like Trenches, is a combination of Tower Defence and Castle Attack genres, the player must create soldiers in order to overwhelm the opposing force. It is largely based on attrition warfare like World War I was. Unlike Trenches, the game has five countries each with their own strengths and weaknesses: France, Germany, Russia, Britain and the USA. The campaign is non-linear as the player can choose what area they would like to attack on a map of Europe.

Reception 

The game was very well received on Apple's App Store, boasting a  out of 5 stars. On other review websites, the game was given poor reviews.

Publishing 

The game uses EA's Origin.
EA’s distribution agreement with the game’s developer had previously expired, but as of February 28, 2013, Trenches 2 was re-released on the iTunes app store for free.

References 

2011 video games
IOS games
IOS-only games
Tower defense video games
Video games developed in the United States
World War I video games